Colet is a surname. Notable people with the surname include:

 Charles-Théodore Colet (1806–1883), French Roman Catholic Archbishop
 Colet Abedi (21st century), Iranian-American writer and producer
 John Colet (1467–1519), English churchman and educational pioneer
 Louise Colet (1810–1876), French poet

See also
 Colet Special Vehicle Design, a Newark, California based aircraft rescue firefighting (ARFF) vehicle manufacturer founded by Ralph Colet

Patronymic surnames
Surnames from given names